Braithwell is a village and civil parish in the Metropolitan Borough of Doncaster in South Yorkshire, England. According to the 2001 Census the civil parish had a population of 1,056, increasing slightly to 1,060 at the 2011 Census.

In 1289, the village obtained a Royal Charter entitling it to hold a weekly Tuesday market and an annual eight-day fair – an unusually long duration. These were long discontinued by a survey of 1652, but a cross shaft survives with an inscription in Norman French which translates as "Jesus, son of Mary, think upon the brother of our king, I beseech you".

The Church of St James in the village is a Grade II* listed building.

See also
Listed buildings in Braithwell

References

External links

Villages in Doncaster
Civil parishes in South Yorkshire